= Gana Abhiyan Orissa =

Gana Abhiyan Orissa (Popular Campaign Odisha), also called Orissa Gana Abhiyan, was a political organization in the Indian state of Odisha. The organization was formed a splinter group of Socialist Unity Centre of India, when the local party leader Mayadhar Naik had been expelled from SUCI in the end of the 1990s. It is registered as an NGO and was never registered as a political party with the Election Commission of India. It is a political platform but not a party.

GAO has worked to a large extent with organizing adivasis and dalits.

In the elections 1999 GAO did not launch any candidates of their own, but support 'left and democratic forces'. Ahead of the 2004 a cooperation with the Indian National Congress was discussed. The exact status of the organization today is unclear, it might be that Naik joined Congress.
